Kachina Village is a census-designated place (CDP) in Coconino County, Arizona, United States. The population was 2,622 at the 2010 census.   Kachina Village is primarily a bedroom community for Flagstaff.

Geography
Kachina Village is located at  (35.097016, -111.692648).

Climate
This region experiences warm (but not hot) and dry summers, with no average monthly temperatures above 71.6 °F.  According to the Köppen Climate Classification system, Kachina Village has a warm-summer Mediterranean climate, abbreviated "Csb" on climate maps.

Demographics

As of the census of 2000, there were 2,664 people, 1,021 households, and 658 families residing in the CDP. The racial makeup of the CDP was 89.0% White, 4.3% Native American, 0.3% Black or African American, 0.3% Asian, <0.1% Pacific Islander, 4.8% from other races, and 1.3% from two or more races.  9.7% of the population were Hispanic or Latino of any race.

There were 1,021 households, out of which 33.5% had children under the age of 18 living with them, 52.4% were married couples living together, 8.1% had a female householder with no husband present, and 35.5% were non-families. 20.0% of all households were made up of individuals, and 2.1% had someone living alone who was 65 years of age or older.  The average household size was 2.61 and the average family size was 3.08.

In the CDP, the age distribution of the population shows 26.0% under the age of 18, 9.5% from 18 to 24, 37.4% from 25 to 44, 22.6% from 45 to 64, and 4.5% who were 65 years of age or older.  The median age was 33 years. For every 100 females, there were 107.3 males.  For every 100 females age 18 and over, there were 109.6 males.

The median income for a household in the CDP was $45,703, and the median income for a family was $51,037. Males had a median income of $34,375 versus $26,750 for females. The per capita income for the CDP was $17,849.  About 4.4% of families and 8.4% of the population were below the poverty line, including 10.5% of those under age 18 and none of those age 65 or over.

Education 
Kachina Village is served by the Flagstaff Unified School District.

References

External links
Kachina Village Improvement District
Highlands Fire District

Census-designated places in Coconino County, Arizona